Merthyr Tydfil County Borough is located in the historic county of Glamorgan in Wales and takes its name from its largest town.

In the United Kingdom, the term listed building refers to a building or other structure officially designated as being of special architectural, historical, or cultural significance. Listing was begun by a provision in the Town and Country Planning Act 1947. Once a building is listed, strict limitations are imposed on the modifications allowed to its structure or fittings and alterations require listed building consent. In Wales, authority for listing or delisting, under the Planning (Listed Buildings and Conservation Areas) Act 1990, rests with the Welsh Ministers, though these decisions are based on the recommendations of Cadw. There are around 30,000 listed buildings in Wales and these are categorised into three grades: Grade I (one), II* (two star) and II (two). The highest is Grade I which denotes "buildings of exceptional interest" and makes up fewer than two per cent of the total number of listed buildings in Wales.

Merthyr Tydfil County Borough has one Grade I listed building, Cyfarthfa Castle. The castle has two listing designations, dating from the time of listing when the castle was subdivided into a museum and a school.

Buildings

|}

See also

 Grade II* listed buildings in Merthyr Tydfil County Borough
 Listed buildings in Wales
 List of Scheduled Monuments in Merthyr Tydfil
 Registered historic parks and gardens in Merthyr Tydfil County Borough

Notes

References

External links

 
Merthry Tydfil County Borough I